"Donnie Fatso" is the ninth episode in the twenty-second season of the American animated television series The Simpsons. It first aired on the Fox network in the United States on December 12, 2010. The plot revolves around an FBI agent, who helps Homer go undercover to infiltrate Fat Tony's mob. Homer agrees to help the FBI in order to reduce his prison sentence on a bribery conviction. This episode is a reference to Goodfellas as well as real-life FBI agent Donnie Brasco.

"Donnie Fatso" was written by Chris Cluess and directed by Ralph Sosa. Critics were polarized with the episode, with criticism stemming from its main plot and cultural references.

Upon its initial airing, the episode received 7.32 million viewers and attained a 3.2/8 rating in the 18-49 demographic, according to Nielsen ratings. "Donnie Fatso" featured guest appearances from Jon Hamm and Joe Mantegna.

Plot
Homer and Marge wake on New Year's Day with hangovers after the family's New Year's Eve celebration. As Homer takes out the garbage, Chief Wiggum, Eddie, and Lou arrive and issue him multiple citations and fines - the result of recently passed, frivolous laws intended to bring in revenue for the city when broken. Taking Moe's suggestion that he bribe a city official to clear up the fines, Homer leaves a sack full of cash on the official's desk but is promptly arrested, convicted, and sentenced to 10 years in prison. Wiggum takes pity on Homer and tells him to meet with an FBI agent, who offers to reduce the sentence if Homer will go undercover in the prison as Nicholas "Nicky" Blue pants Altosaxophony to investigate Fat Tony, who is also serving time along as his top henchmen.

Homer quickly gains favor with Fat Tony, due to a confrontation engineered by the FBI agent, and Fat Tony breaks him and the entire group out of prison and offers him a chance to join the syndicate. Homer's first task is to burn down Moe's Tavern in revenge for Moe's rudeness toward Fat Tony on the phone, but Homer finds that Moe has already done the deed himself. Fat Tony accepts Homer into the syndicate and the two develop a special bond; however, complications over a scheme to import weapons put the syndicate under severe stress. Eventually Fat Tony discovers Homer's undercover status and, emotionally devastated by his betrayal, dies of a fatal heart attack.

Meanwhile, Marge has begun to panic over being unable to communicate with Homer, as she knows nothing of his undercover work and cannot get any information on his whereabouts. She is surprised and thrilled when he returns home with his prison sentence lifted, but Homer feels guilt for Fat Tony's death and bitterness toward the government over being used to bring him down. Homer visits Fat Tony's grave to apologize, but is kidnapped by his cousin Fit Tony, who plans to kill him for revenge. However, Fit Tony spares his life after Homer tells of the time he and Fat Tony spent together, seeing that Fat Tony lives on in Homer's memories. Fit Tony takes charge of the syndicate, but the stress of the position causes him to overeat and gain weight, eventually becoming indistinguishable from Fat Tony and assuming his name.

Production

Donnie Fatso was written by Chris Cluess and directed by Ralph Sosa. In July 2010, it was announced that Jon Hamm would make a guest appearance in the episode as an agent for the FBI. In his interview with Entertainment Weekly, showrunner Al Jean was pleased with Hamm's performance, opining: "You gave him one note and he immediately did twelve great things with it. He was really funny. And handsome. He had it all. Hamm stated that appearing on the show was "an incredible experience". In his interview with Access Hollywood, he continued, "I got to work on The Simpsons, which I watched for 20 years and the show is still fresh and still funny and the characters still resonate. It’s one of the best shows on television. It was an honor to be asked to be a part of it." Joe Mantegna returned as Fat Tony, and voiced Fat Tony's cousin Fit Tony.

The opening sequence of "Donnie Fatso" featured a Fox News helicopter with the words "Merry Christmas from Fox News… But no other holidays." It was the third episode of the season to satirize Fox News in its opening sequence, having first done so in "The Fool Monty", in which helicopter can be seen hovering over New York City with the slogan "Fox News: Not Racist, But #1 With Racists". Bill O'Reilly, host of The O'Reilly Factor, harshly criticized the show, calling the producers "pinheads". He resumed: "Continuing to bite the hand that feeds part of it, Fox broadcasting once again allows its cartoon characters to run wild." In response, producers added a brief scene at the beginning of the opening sequence in the following episode, "How Munched is That Birdie in the Window?", in which a helicopter appears bearing the slogan "Fox News: Unsuitable for Viewers Under 75." The scene was later removed from the opening sequence of "How Munched is That Birdie in the Window?", and was replaced by one reminiscing the film King Kong.

Cultural references 
"Donnie Fatso" features several references to music, film, media, and other pop culture phenomenon, mostly mafia-crime centric.

The episode's plot and title are parodical to that of the film Donnie Brasco.

When Homer and Moe are searching for a place to talk, they walk onto a stage that seems to be showing a production of the musical Wicked.

At the end of the episode, Homer's monologue serves as a shot-by-shot homage to the final monologue-voiceover of Henry Hill in Goodfellas. A lot of dialogue from the original is repeated, although there are noticeable changes. When Homer comes to the conclusion that he's living a pretty good life, this is seen as a sharp contrast to a downcast Henry Hill's thoughts about how he misses the mafia life.

Near the end of the episode, Fit Tony narrowly avoids a car bomb, a scene similar to that of Robert DeNiro's character, Frank 'Ace' Rothstein in Casino.

Also in homage to Goodfellas, is the final shot where Maggie is seen firing a revolver at the screen, much like Joe Pesci in the end of the movie. This is followed by text on-screen detailing the fate of each of the characters in the episode, much like in the movie.

Both of the above are set to Sid Vicious' rendition of "My Way", and the text is delivered the same way as it is in Goodfellas.

The final text also mentions Nicholas Pileggi, an author who collaborated with Scorsese on Goodfellas and Casino.

The final scene between Fat Tony and Homer is reminiscent to that of the television show Wiseguy.

Reception
"Donnie Fatso" was first broadcast on December 12, 2010 in the United States as part of the animation television night on Fox.  The episode was viewed by an estimated 7.32 million viewers, despite airing simultaneously with Extreme Makeover Home Edition on ABC, The Amazing Race on CBS, and a game between the Philadelphia Eagles and the Dallas Cowboys as part of the 2010 NFL season on NBC. "Donnie Fatso" garnered a 3.2/8 rating in the 18-49 demographic, according to the Nielsen ratings. The episode also became the third highest rated show of the week on Fox, only behind Glee and Family Guy.

The episode attained mixed receptions from television critics.

Emily VanDerWerff of The A.V. Club gave the episode a 'C' grade. VanDerWerff felt that the episode was "fairly lazy", and commented that the main plot was "too much of a mob movie pastiche."

Eric Hochberger of TV Fanatic criticized the humor of the episode, opining that "for an episode with such an overdone story, we could have forgiven things if it were at least funnier." He continued: "Unfortunately, there just weren't enough jokes to make the episode worth it." In conclusion of his review, Hochberger gave "Donnie Fatso" a 2.5 out of 5 stars.

Critics were also polarized with the conclusion of Fat Tony, and the addition of Fit Tony. Entertainment Weekly writer Darren Franich named Fat Tony's death the ninth Best TV Character Death of 2010, writing, "give the writers some credit for doing something different: In the middle of an otherwise straightforward mob-themed episode, they actually went ahead and killed off Fat Tony, a character who was first introduced almost twenty years ago."

Dan Castellaneta's performance in the episode, as Homer, Barney, Krusty and Louie, was nominated for the Primetime Emmy Award for Outstanding Voice-Over Performance at the 63rd Primetime Emmy Awards, but lost to Maurice LaMarche, who received the award for his role in the Futurama episode "Lrrreconcilable Ndndifferences".

Chris Cluess was nominated for a Writers Guild of America Award for Outstanding Writing in Animation at the 64th Writers Guild of America Awards for his script to this episode.

References

External links
 
 "Donnie Fatso" at theSimpsons.com

2010 American television episodes
The Simpsons (season 22) episodes
Black comedy
New Year television episodes
Television episodes about organized crime
Television episodes set in prisons